Hōri Kerei Taiaroa (born 1830s or early 1840s – 4 August 1905), also known as Huriwhenua, was a Māori member of the New Zealand parliament and the paramount chief of the southern iwi of Ngāi Tahu. The son of Ngāi Tahu leader Te Mātenga Taiaroa and Mawera Taiaroa, he was born at Ōtākou on the Otago Peninsula in the 1830s or early 1840s.

He represented the Southern Maori electorate from 1871 to February 1879, when he appointed to the Legislative Council. He was disqualified from the Legislative Council in August 1880 over a technicality, which caused bitterness and resentment among Māori.

When appointed by Sir George Grey Taiaroa held (and continued to hold) a salaried (government) office, hence was not eligible to sit in the council, despite having attended three sessions. He was drawing a salary as a Native Assessor  and it was suggested that a Validation Act would have been passed for a European member in that situation.

In 1881 Ihaia Tainui who had held the electorate since 1879 resigned so that Taiaroa could resume the electorate. Taiaroa then held the electorate from 1881 to 1885 when he was again appointed to the Legislative Council, where he served for 20 years until his death.

Taiaroa was active in pursuing Ngāi Tahu land claims in Parliament.

Taiaroa's son John Taiaroa played all for the All Blacks in their 1884 tour of New South Wales and went on to work as a lawyer in Hastings.

References

19th-century births
1905 deaths
Members of the New Zealand House of Representatives
New Zealand MPs for Māori electorates
Ngāi Tahu people
New Zealand MPs for South Island electorates
Members of the New Zealand Legislative Council
People from Otago Peninsula
19th-century New Zealand politicians
Ellison family